Uvarovka is a rural locality (a khutor) in Kalinovskoye Rural Settlement, Kikvidzensky District, Volgograd Oblast, Russia. The population was 6 in 2010.

Geography 
Uvarovka is located in steppe, on Khopyorsko-Buzulukskaya plain, on the right bank of the Machekha River, 35 km northeast of Preobrazhenskaya (the district's administrative centre) by road. Yezhovka is the nearest rural locality.

References 

Rural localities in Kikvidzensky District